is a song that served as an opening theme for the anime series, Sailor Moon.

The song's original version was released in Japan on March 21, 1992, on a split single by Dali and Misae Takamatsu titled . The Dali recording of "Moonlight Densetsu" served as the opening theme for the first two seasons of Sailor Moon's anime adaptation. Another version of "Moonlight Densetsu" by Moon Lips was the opening theme of the next two Sailor Moon anime seasons.

The English dubbed Sailor Moon broadcast in North America adopted an English cover version with the rewritten lyrics. 

A French language cover version, translated and performed by the Japan-based French singer Clémentine, was included in Sailor Moons 20th Anniversary Memorial Tribute album as a bonus track in 2014.

 Reception 
The song "Moonlight Densetsu" was a big hit in Japan. In 1995, the original 1992 single by Dali et al. was certified Gold by the Recording Industry Association of Japan.  An online survey conducted in 2008 by Goo recognized it as the most popular song from an anime series for karaoke from 1991 to 2000.  "Moonlight Densetsu" won first place in the Song category in Animage's 15th and 16th Anime Grand Prix. It came seventh in the 17th Grand Prix. According to a poll conducted by Japanese music magazine CD&DL Data in 2016 about the most representative songs associated with the moon, the original version by Dali was ranked 4th by 6203 respondents aging from teens to thirties. In 2019, the original Dali version won the Performance Award of the Heisei Anisong Grand Prize among the anime theme songs from 1989 to 1999. "Moonlight Densetsu" was ranked 12th in Onegai! Ranking Series' derivative variety show "130,000 People Vote! Anime Song General Election" broadcast by TV Asahi on September 6, 2020.

Due to the high similarity of its melody to the song "Sayonara wa dansu no nochi ni" (lit. "Goodbye After the Dance", composed by Hirooki Ogawa, lyrics by Hiroshi Yokoi), the composer, Ogawa, negotiated through JASRAC and reached a settlement under the condition that he would receive a certain amount of money.

 Track listings 1992 single (Columbia CODC-8995)

 is a split single by Dali and Misae Takamatsu. It was released in Japan on March 21, 1992.
  — Dali (DALI)
  — 
 "Moonlight Densetsu" (Original Karaoke)
 "Heart Moving" (Original Karaoke)1995 single (Columbia CODC-8995)

 is a single by MoonLips and Meu. It was released in Japan on July 21, 1995. The single was used for the Sailor Moon S and Sailor Moon Super S, respectively.
  — MoonLips
  — Meu
 "Moonlight Densetsu" (Original Karaoke)
 "Rashiku Ikimasho" (Original Karaoke)2000 single''' (Columbia CODC-1873)

 is a split single by Dali and Yoko Ishida. It was released in Japan on June 21, 2000. The second track, "Otome no Policy", had been used to end Sailor Moon R and Sailor Moon S''.
  — Dali (DALI)
  — 
 "Moonlight Densetsu" (Original Karaoke)
 "Otome no Policy" (Original Karaoke)

References 

1992 singles
1992 songs
1995 singles
1995 songs
2000 singles
2000 songs
Sailor Moon songs
Animated series theme songs
Children's television theme songs
Split EPs
Nippon Columbia singles